Diskretni Heroji (Serbian Дискретни Хероји; English: Discreet Heroes), is the third studio album released in 2010 by the Serbian hip-hop collective Beogradski Sindikat. It contains the following 17 tracks.

Track listing
"Почетак/Početak" (Beginning) - 0:51
"За Све Моје Људе/Za Sve Moje Ljude" (For All My People) - 4:01
"Свим Срцем/Svim Srcem" (Wholeheartedly) - 4:29
"Човек/Čoveк" (Man) - 3:59
"Гала-Социјала/Gala-Socijala" (Social Gala) - 2:06
"Главом У Зид/Glavom u zid" (Head In The Wall) - 5:16
"Зајеби/Zajebi" (Fuck It) - 3:38
"Ту Сам Ја/Tu Sam Ja" (Here I Am) - 3:15
"Пази, Пази/Pazi,Pazi" (Caution, Caution) - 4:18
"Искуство/Iskustvo" (Experience) - 4:20
"Освета/Osveta" (Revenge) - 3:58
"Сведок(Сарадник)/Svedok (Saradnik)" (Witness (Collaborator)) - 5:36
"Welcome to Србија/Welcome to Srbija" (Welcome to Serbia) - 4:09
"Оловни Војници/Olovni vojnici" (Lead Soldiers) - 3:56
"Нема Повлачења, Нема Предаје/Nema Povlačenja,Nema Predaje" (No Retreat, No Surrender) - 5:20
"Балада Дисидента/Balada Disidenta" (Dissenters' Ballad) - 4:05
"Још Ову Ноћ/Još ovu noć" (Just This Night) - 4:31

See also
Serbian hip hop

Beogradski Sindikat albums
2005 albums